Sir John Maxwell Hill  (25 March 1914 – 6 May 2004) was a British police officer.

Early life
Hill was born in Plymouth, the son of a civil servant. He was educated at Plymouth College and joined the Metropolitan Police as a constable in 1933. In 1938 he was selected for Hendon Police College and passed out the following year.

War years
During the Second World War, Hill served in the Royal Air Force Volunteer Reserve. Enlisting in 1942, he was commissioned (from the rank of leading aircraftman) as a pilot officer in February 1944. In August 1944, he was promoted flying officer. In September 1945, while serving with 622 Squadron, he was awarded the Distinguished Flying Cross (DFC).

Post-war career
Hill returned to the Metropolitan Police after the war at the rank of inspector. He was later promoted deputy commander at Scotland Yard in 1959. In 1963, he was promoted commander and appointed second-in-command of No.3 District (North-East London). In 1964, he transferred to No.1 District (North-West London) and in 1965 he was appointed one of HM Inspectors of Constabulary.

He returned to the Metropolitan Police as Assistant Commissioner "A" (Operations and Administration) in October 1966. In 1968 he became Assistant Commissioner "D" (Personnel and Training), and on 1 April 1972 he was appointed Deputy Commissioner of Police of the Metropolis. He was appointed Commander of the Order of the British Empire (CBE) in 1969.

On 3 December 1972, he became HM Chief Inspector of Constabulary. He was knighted in the 1974 New Year Honours and retired in 1975.

Footnotes

References
Biography, Who Was Who

1914 births
2004 deaths
Military personnel from Plymouth, Devon
People from Plymouth, Devon
People educated at Plymouth College
Assistant Commissioners of Police of the Metropolis
Deputy Commissioners of Police of the Metropolis
Knights Bachelor
Commanders of the Order of the British Empire
Recipients of the Distinguished Flying Cross (United Kingdom)
English recipients of the Queen's Police Medal
Metropolitan Police recipients of the Queen's Police Medal
Royal Air Force officers
Royal Air Force airmen
Royal Air Force Volunteer Reserve personnel of World War II
Chief Inspectors of Constabulary (England and Wales)